Qualification for the 2001 Little League World Series took place in sixteen different parts of the world during July and August 2001, with formats and number of teams varying by region.

Asia

The tournament took place in Hong Kong from July 28–August 4.

Canada

The tournament was held in Vancouver, British Columbia from August 4–11.

Caribbean

The tournament took place in Panama City, Panama from July 20–28.

Europe, Middle East and Africa

The tournament took place in Kutno, Poland from August 2–10.

Great Lakes

The tournament took place in Indianapolis, Indiana from August 4–12.

Gulf

The tournament took place in Waco, Texas from August 5–11.

Latin America

The tournament took place in Panama City, Panama from July 20–28.

Mexico

The tournament took place from July 14–20.

Mid-Atlantic

The tournament took place in Bristol, Connecticut from August 5–14.

*All games played by the New York representative, Rolando Paulino Little League, were forfeited due to the use of an ineligible player, Danny Almonte.  The Mid-Atlantic Championship was retroactively awarded to the Pennsylvania representative, the State College American Little League.

Midwest

The tournament took place in Indianapolis, Indiana from August 4–12.

New England

The tournament was held in Bristol, Connecticut from August 5–14.

Northwest

The tournament was held in San Bernardino, California from August 4–14.

Pacific

The tournament took place in Hong Kong from July 29–August 3.

Southeast

The tournament took place in St. Petersburg, Florida from August 3–12.

Transatlantic

The tournament was held in Kutno, Poland from July 8–15.

West

The tournament took place in San Bernardino, California from August 4–14.

Little League World Series
Little League Z